Mariella is an extinct ammonoid.

Mariella may also refer to:

, Finnish cruiseferry operated by Viking Line
"Mariella", song by Kate Nash from her album Made of Bricks

Given name
Mariella Adani (born 1934), Italian soprano
Mariella Devia (born 1948), Italian soprano
Mariella Farré (born 1963), Swiss singer
Mariella Frostrup (born 1962), Norwegian-born British journalist
Mariella Lotti (1921–2006), Italian film actress
Mariella Mehr (born 1947), Swiss writer
Mariella Balbuena Torres (born 1979; better known as Mari Apache), wrestler

Fictional characters
Mariella (Black Clover), a character in the manga series Black Clover

Variation: Marilla Cuthbert, a main character in the Anne of Green Gables novels

See also
Mariela
Marielle (given name)
Marella (disambiguation)

Italian feminine given names